Altiphylax stoliczkai, also known commonly as the frontier bow-fingered gecko, the Baltistan gecko, and the Karakorum gecko is a species of lizard in the family Gekkonidae. The species is endemic to South Asia.

Etymology
The specific name, stoliczkai, is in honor of Moravian zoologist Ferdinand Stoliczka.

Geographic range
A. stoliczkai is found in India (Kashmir, Karoo/Dras, Ladakh) and western China.

The type locality given by Steindachner is "bei Karoo, nördlich von Dras, Kashmir ".

Habitat

Reproduction
A. stoliczkai is oviparous.

Taxonomy
Most authorities, most recently Bauer et al. 2013, now consider Böhme's mountain gecko to be a subspecies of this species (A. s. boehmei).

References

Further reading
Shcherbak NN (1991). "Eine neue Gecko-Art aus Pakistan: Alsophylax (Alsophylax) boehmei sp. nov." Salamandra 27 (1): 53-57. (in German).
Shcherbak NN, Golubev ML (1996). Gecko fauna of the USSR and contiguous regions. SSAR (Society for the Study of Amphibians and Reptiles). (English translation of Russian original published in 1986).
Anderson J (1872). "On some Persian, Himalayan, and other Reptiles". Proc. Zool. Soc. London 1872: 371-404.
Boulenger GA (1885). Catalogue of the Lizards in the British Museum (Natural History). Second Edition. Volume I. Geckonidæ ...  London: Trustees of the British Museum (Natural History). (Taylor and Francis, printers). xii + 436 pp. + Plates I-XXXII. ("Gymnodactylus stoliczkæ [sic]", pp. 30–31).
Boulenger GA (1890). The Fauna of British India, Including Ceylon and Burma. Reptilia and Batrachia. London: Secretary of State for India in Council. (Taylor and Francis, printers). xviii + 541 pp. ("Gymnodactylus stoliczkæ [sic]", pp. 63–64).
Ingoldby CM (1922). "A new stone gecko from the Himalaya". J. Bombay Nat. Hist. Soc. 28: 1051. (Gymnodactylus walli, new species).
Khan MS, Rösler H (2000). "Redescription and generic redesignation of the Ladakhian gecko Gymnodactylus stoliczkai Steindachner, 1969 [1867]". Asiatic Herpetological Research 8 [1999]: 60-68.
Khan MS (2000). "Redescription and generic redesignation of Gymnodactylus stoliczkai Steindachner, 1867". Pakistan J. Zool. 32 (2): 157.
Smith MA (1935). The Fauna of British India, Including Ceylon and Burma. Reptilia and Amphibia. Vol. II.—Sauria. London: Secretary of State for India in Council. (Taylor and Francis, printers). xiii + 440 pp. + Plate I + 2 maps. (Gymnodactylus stoliczkai, pp. 57–58).
Steindachner F (1867). "Reptilien ". pp. 1–98. In: von Wüllerstorf-Urbair B (1867) ["1869" on title page]. Reise der Österreichischen Fregatte Novara um die Erde in den Jahren 1857, 1858, 1859 unter den Befehlen des Commodore B. von Wüllerstorf-Urbair (Zoologie), [Vol. 1, part 3]. Vienna: K. Gerold's Sohn/Kaiserlich-Königl. Hof- und Staatsdruckerei. (Gymnodactylus stoliczkai, new species, pp. 15–16). (in German).

External links

Altiphylax
Lizards of Asia
Reptiles of China
Reptiles of India
Reptiles of Pakistan
Reptiles described in 1867
Taxa named by Franz Steindachner